William González (born 27 December 1969) is a Venezuelan footballer. He played in twenty matches for the Venezuela national football team from 1995 to 1997. He was also part of Venezuela's squad for the 1997 Copa América tournament.

References

External links
 

1969 births
Living people
Venezuelan footballers
Venezuela international footballers
Place of birth missing (living people)
Association football defenders
20th-century Venezuelan people